Georges Hausemer (1 February 1957 – 13 August 2018) was a Luxembourgish writer who published short stories, novels, travelogues and non-fictional works and also translated a considerable number of works from French, English, Spanish and Luxembourgish into German. Sometimes using the pen name Theo Selmer, he also worked as an illustrator.

Biography

Born on 1 February 1957 in Differdange, Hausemer studied journalism and romance languages in Salzburg and Mainz. Since 1984, he has worked as a freelance author, translator and travel writer in Esch-sur-Alzette. He frequently contributed literary articles and reports to national and international newspapers. He travelled widely, publishing a number of books based on his journeys.

Selected works

Non-fiction

"D'Stad Lëtzebuerg (The City of Luxembourg) - Excursions and Impressions", photographer Rob Kieffer. Editions Guy Binsfeld. Luxembourg, 2000, pp. 240 ,
"Echternach: Entdecken – Découvrir – Discover", photographer Guy Hoffmann, Editions Guy Binsfeld 2005, pp. 128 .
"Culinary Luxembourg: Country, People & Cuisine", photographer Guy Hoffman, Editions Guy Binsfeld, Luxembourg, 2009, pp. 240

Fiction

 Die Gesetze der Schwerkraft. Editions Phi, Echternach, 1995, pp. 124  
 Die Tote aus Arlon. Gollenstein Verlag, Blieskastel, 1997, pp. 240  
 Iwwer Waasser. Roman, Editions Phi, Echternach 1998, pp. 192

References

External links
Georges Hausemer's website  

1957 births
2018 deaths
Luxembourgian writers
Luxembourgian novelists
People from Differdange
Luxembourgian short story writers
Luxembourgian translators
English–German translators
French–German translators
Spanish–German translators
Luxembourgian illustrators
Luxembourgian journalists
Male journalists
International Writing Program alumni
20th-century translators